Central Udon (previously Charoensri Complex, CentralPlaza Udon Thani) is a shopping mall on Prajaksilapakom Road, Mueang Udon Thani District, Udon Thani. Central Pattana acquired the former Charoensri complex on 8 April 2009. Plans have been made to renovate and expand the complex on a  land plot.

History 
The shopping mall was established as Charoensri Complex in 1994 by Udon Charoensri (1968) Ltd.

Mall renovations 
CentralPlaza Udon Thani had  a major mall renovation and expansion  between October 2010 and 27 March 2012, had a grand opening on 10 May 2012.

Anchors 
 Central Department Store (2 October 2020 - Present , Renovate from Robinson department store)
 Tops
 Major Cineplex 8 Cinemas
 B2S
 Officemate
 Power Buy
 Supersports
 Sport World
 Food Park
 Fun Planet
 Fitness First
 Udonthani Hall
 Centara Hotel & Convention centre Udonthani (Previously : Charoensri Grand Royal Hotel)

Previously anchor 
 Robinson department store (First branch in upcountry , 30 August 1995 - September 2020)

See also 
 List of shopping malls in Thailand

References

Notes

External links 
 CentralPlaza website
 Robinson Department Store

Shopping malls in Thailand
Central Pattana
Shopping malls established in 1994
1994 establishments in Thailand